Proem-Aid ('Professional Emergency Aid') is a Spanish NGO which operates in the Mediterranean Sea with the aims of aiding and rescuing those in distress on the water. It was formed by a group of emergency service workers who volunteered their time and expertise, and initially operated off Lesbos beginning in December 2015 before also starting an operation in the central Mediterranean in September 2017.

Projects and vessels
Since 2016 the organisation has collagorated with the Sea-Watch organisation to run the LifeLine project.

PROEM intend to use their ship Life (which was formerly named Seefuchs, and was donated to PROEM in 2018, at which point she was renamed) for training volunteers and to raise awareness of the problems faced by refugees.

In 2021 PROEM acquired the ship Alan Kurdi. As of December 2020, the Alan Kurdi was non-operational and moored in the port of Olbia, and subject to ongoing legal proceedings.

External links
 proemaid.org Official website

References 

Sea rescue organizations
European migrant crisis
Immigrant rights activism
Humanitarian aid organizations in Europe
Refugee aid organizations in Europe